Badger is a British television police procedural drama series, broadcast between 11 July 1999 and 1 September 2000. Produced by Feelgood Films, and broadcast on BBC One, a total of thirteen episodes were broadcast over the course of two series. The series stars Jerome Flynn as lead character Tom McCabe, a police wildlife liaison officer, who is tasked with fighting wildlife crime in his home county of Northumberland. The series was created by Ballykissangel creator Kieran Prendiville, and the character of McCabe was based upon a close associate of Prendiville, Paul Henery, who was himself a police wildlife liaison officer at the time of recording.

In April 2000, Craster became the set for the second series; with many of the local buildings taking on new identities, and the Harbour Cottage being transformed into a local jail, complete with bars across the window. The yard was also used as the back of the police station. Flynn said of the series; "I've always felt passionate about animals, so loved the script when it was sent to me. I also have family and friends in Northumberland and have a particular affinity with the North East." Regarding Henery, Flynn said; "Paul was a large inspiration because he was the real thing. I connected with him right away, understood what's driving him to do the job. It's not really police work, it's a passion with him, trying to keep the animals wild ... he's just passionate about preventing needless suffering." An official book based on the series was issued by BBC Books on 6 July 2000. Notably, the series has never been released on DVD.

Cast
 Jerome Flynn as DC Tom McCabe
 Adrian Bower as DC Jim Cassidy
 Kevin Doyle as DI David Armitage
 Rebecca Lacey as Claire Armitage
 Phillippa Wilson as Steph Allen
 Scott Karalius as Liam Allen
 Alison Mac as Wilf McCabe
 Jayne McKenzie as Julia
 Conor Mullen as Ralph Allen
 Brendan P. Healy as Ray
 Terry Joyce as Sgt. Deakin
 Michael Wardle as Martin

Episodes

Series 1 (1999)

Series 2 (2000)

References

External links

1999 British television series debuts
2000 British television series endings
1990s British police procedural television series
2000s British police procedural television series
Television shows set in Northumberland
English-language television shows